Miss Supranational Myanmar also known as Miss Burma Supranational is a national pageant to select Myanmar's representative to the Miss Supranational pageant. This pageant is unrelated to the Miss Universe Myanmar, Miss International Myanmar, Miss World Myanmar or Miss Golden Land Myanmar national contests.

History

Former, Miss Golden Land Myanmar Organization has been responsible for selecting the representatives of Myanmar for Miss Supranational international pageants from 2013 to 2019. At the time, Miss Golden Land Myanmar was a generic title used to refer to Myanmar representatives to Miss Supranational.

Starting from 2020, the Miss Burma Organization will select and send Miss Myanmar representatives for Miss Supranational. Therefore, the Miss Burma title will now be used to refer to Myanmar representatives to Miss Supranational.

Titleholders

Winners by City/Town

International pageants 
Color key

Miss Supranational

See also 
 Miss Burma (1947–1962)
 Miss Universe Myanmar
 Miss World Myanmar
 Miss International Myanmar
 Miss Earth Myanmar
 Mister Myanmar

References

External links
 Page

Myanmar
Beauty pageants in Myanmar